Oscar Richard Hundley (October 30, 1855 – December 22, 1921) was a United States district judge of the United States District Court for the Northern District of Alabama.

Education and career

Born in Limestone County, Alabama, Hundley received a Bachelor of Laws from Vanderbilt University Law School in 1877. He was in private practice of law in Huntsville, Alabama from 1878 to 1907, serving as a division counsel to the Nashville, Chattanooga and St. Louis Railway from 1884 to 1907. He was city attorney of Huntsville from 1886 to 1890. He was a member of the Alabama House of Representatives from 1886 to 1890, and of the Alabama Senate from 1890 to 1898. From 1906 to 1907, he was an Assistant United States Attorney for the Northern District of Alabama.

Federal judicial service

Hundley received a recess appointment from President Theodore Roosevelt on April 9, 1907, to the United States District Court for the Northern District of Alabama, to a new seat authorized by 34 Stat. 931. He was nominated to the same position by President Roosevelt on December 3, 1907. His service terminated on May 30, 1908, after his nomination was not confirmed by the United States Senate. He received a second recess appointment from President Roosevelt on May 30, 1908, to the same position. He was nominated to the same position by President Roosevelt on December 8, 1908. His service terminated on March 3, 1909, after his nomination was not confirmed by the Senate. He received a third recess appointment from President William Howard Taft on March 6, 1909, to same position, however, President Taft did not renominate him. His service terminated on May 25, 1909, due to his resignation.

Later career and death

After his resignation from the federal bench, Hundley was President and general counsel for the Sun Life Insurance Company in Birmingham, Alabama in 1913. He died in Birmingham on December 22, 1921.

References

Sources
 

1855 births
1921 deaths
Members of the Alabama House of Representatives
Alabama state senators
Judges of the United States District Court for the Northern District of Alabama
United States district court judges appointed by Theodore Roosevelt
20th-century American judges
United States district court judges appointed by William Howard Taft
Unsuccessful recess appointments to United States federal courts
Vanderbilt University Law School alumni
People from Limestone County, Alabama
Assistant United States Attorneys